This is a list of listed buildings in Assens Municipality, Denmark.

''Note:: This list is incomplete. A complete list og listed buildings in Vordingborg Municipality can be found on Danish Wikipedia.

The list

5560 Aarup

5610 Assens

5620 Glamsbjerg

5631 Ebberup

5683 Haarby

References

External links

 Danish Agency of Culture

 
Assens